This is a list of Association football games played by the Denmark national football team between 1950 and 1959. During the 1950s, the Danish national team played 72 games, winning 25, drawing 14, and losing 33. In these games, they scored 138 goals, while conceding 163 to their opponents. The first game of the 1950s was the May 28, 1950, game against Yugoslavia, the 162nd overall Danish national team game. The last game of the 1950s was the December 6, 1959, game against Bulgaria, the 233rd game of the Danish national team.

Key
ENQ - European Nations Cup Qualifying match
F – Friendly match
NC - Nordic Football Championship match
OG - Olympic Games match
OGQ - Olympic Games Qualifying match
OT - Other tournament(s)
WCQ – World Cup Qualifying match

Games
Note that scores are written Denmark first

See also
List of Denmark national football team results
Denmark national football team statistics

Sources
Landsholdsdatabasen  at Danish Football Association
A-LANDSKAMPE - 1950 - 1959 at Haslund.info

1950s
1949–50 in Danish football
1950–51 in Danish football
1951–52 in Danish football
1952–53 in Danish football
1953–54 in Danish football
1954–55 in Danish football
1955–56 in Danish football
1956–57 in Danish football
1958 in Danish football
1959 in Danish football